The 1929 Boston College Eagles football team represented Boston College as an independent during the 1929 college football season. Led by second-year head coach Joe McKenney, the Eagles compiled a record of 7–2–1.

Schedule

References

Boston College
Boston College Eagles football seasons
College football undefeated seasons
Boston College Eagles football
1920s in Boston